is a commercial district in Chūō-ku, Niigata City. It is located north-west of Niigata Station, and faces the Shinano River.

It is a popular shopping area of Niigata City, with commercial building complexes and department stores. It also has movie theaters and the theater of idol girl group, NGT48.

Main Establishments 
Most of the building complexes are connected by footbridges.

Bandai 1 
Bandai City Bus Center
Rainbow Tower
LoveLa Bandai
LoveLa 2
NGT48 theater
Bandai Silver Hotel
Niigata ALTA

Bandai 3 
Niigata Nippo Media Ship

Yachiyo 1,2 
Niigata Isetan
Bandai City Billboard Place
Bandai City Billboard Place 2
Niigata Manga Animation Museum
Across Niigata

Transportation 
Most of the Niigata Kotsu buses depart from Bandai City Bus Center or nearby bus stop "Bandai City".

See also 
Furumachi (Niigata)
Chūō-ku, Niigata

References

External links 
Official website

Niigata (city)